Mount Eden Hospital (also known as Mt. Eden Hospital or Mt. Eden General Hospital) was located in the Bronx; it was razed in 2011. The BronxCare Health and Wellness Center, an outpatient medical facility, now exists at that location.

The name "Mt. Eden Hospital" is used in The Unruly Life of Woody Allen.

Controversy
The hospital was sued because, on July 14, 1958, "The plaintiff underwent an operation in which surgical clamps were used but were not removed."

The United States Pension Benefit Guarantee Corporation (PBGC)'s "case number 197000, Termination date: May 15, 1975" is regarding
"MT EDEN GENERAL HOSPITAL."

References

Defunct hospitals in the Bronx
History of the Bronx